Jack Garland may refer to:

 Jack Garland (Australian politician) (1922–1993), member of the New South Wales Legislative Council
 Jack Garland (boxer) (1908–1985), boxer from Northern Ireland
 Jack Garland (Canadian politician) (1918–1964), member of the Canadian House of Commons
 Jack Bee Garland (1869–1936), transgender author, nurse and adventurer

Other uses
 Jack Garland, the player character of the 2022 video game Stranger of Paradise: Final Fantasy Origin
 Jack Garland Airport, named for the Canadian politician

See also 
 John Garland (disambiguation)